Quaid-e-Azam Football Club or Quaid-e-Azam FC is a Football club in Islamabad, Pakistan, which was founded in 1971.

References

Football clubs in Pakistan
1971 establishments in Pakistan
Association football clubs established in 1971
Football in Islamabad